First Fruits is a religious offering of the first agricultural produce of the harvest. In classical Greek, Roman, and Hebrew religions, the first fruits were given to priests as an offering to deity.  In Christian faiths, the tithe is similarly given as a donation or offering serving as a primary source of income to maintain the religious leaders and facilities. In some Christian texts, Jesus Christ, through his resurrection, is referred to as the first fruits of the dead. Beginning in 1966 a unique "First Fruits" celebration brought the Ancient African harvest festivals that became the African American holiday, Kwanzaa.

Ancient historical

In ancient Greece
In Classical Athens the First Fruits were called an offering of aparche. Except during times of war, this would be a major source of funds for the temples of the Eleusinian goddesses, Demeter and Kore. Much of the agricultural offering was sold by the temple with the proceeds being used to pay for the daily upkeep of the temple complex. Under Pericles' rule, it became a way of extending Athens' power. The Demos or voting citizens would control the operation of the temple by elected boards. During times of war or for other necessity the Demos would borrow money from the treasury of the temple. Neighboring cities under Athens' control were required to give offerings from their harvests. This served to enrich Athens and extend her power.

Much of this was shown in the temple reports which were carved in stone when the governing body (called the epistatai) of the temple changed hands. In the stone IG I3 386-387 it can be seen how the finances of the Eleusinian temples worked. Doctor Maureen B. Cavanaugh who translated stone IG I3 386–387, argues that there were heavy implications of the funding realized from the First Fruits donations to the temple, in particular that it brought significant impact on Athenian power. This is noted in a loan cited in the stone record, of over 20,000 silver drachmas to the city.

Inscription IG I2 76 shows the provisions made for the offering of first fruits to Demeter and Kore by Athenian demes, Athens' allies and other Greek cities. It sets out that one six-hundredth of the barley crop and one twelve-hundredth of the wheat was to be offered to the goddesses. The proposal for the decree came from a special board of 'draftsmen' (syngrapheis), which suggests that the matter was deemed relatively complicated. Sacrifices were to be paid for out of the proceeds from the barley and wheat, votive offerings were to be made to the two goddesses, and the rest of the grain was to be sold. There were clearly concerns that some allies might avoid offering grain by claiming that they had come to Athens but never been received by officials there. So, the inscription insists that the Hieropoioi accept the grain within five days, or otherwise be subject to a substantial fine of 1000 drachmas. In order to draw in other Greeks, the Hieropoioi were then to record the weight of grain received on a board and distribute it to other cities, encouraging them to contribute. Lampon, a renowned seer in fifth-century Athens, moved a rider in which he proposed several changes to the draft decree: that the decree should be inscribed on stelai both in Eleusis and in Athens, that there should be an intercalary month in the following year, and that the Pelargikon (sacred land around the western end of the Acropolis) should be tidied up and protected. This demonstrates the authority which he gained from his expertise as a seer – notable since the Athenians tended to shy away from the recognition of experts in most fields.

The motivation behind the offering of first fruits is a combination of three religious factors: the need to honour the two goddesses, obedience to Apollo (in the form of the oracle), and 'ancestral custom'. The last two factors suggest that a recent oracle was in line with an older practice which had either fallen into disuse, or was being transformed into a much larger affair. In return for the offering, 'there will be many benefits in abundance of good harvests if they are men who do not injure the Athenians'. The reward, therefore, although it could only be guaranteed by the gods, was conditional on not injuring Athens. The decree cannot be dated precisely, however the combination of specific religious policy and Athenian political dominance evident here is relevant throughout Athens' imperial period. It is an example of Athens striving to advertise her claims to leadership in Greece, whilst simultaneously binding herself more closely with her allies. Similar to this is the expectation that allies would bring annual tribute to the City Dionysia, and sacrificial contributions to the Panathenaea.

Hebrew perspective

For the ancient Israelites, Bikkurim, described in the Bikkurim tractate of the Talmud, were a type of "first fruits" sacrificial offering. The major obligation to bring Bikkurim to the Temple began at the festival of Shavuot and continued until the festival of Sukkot. This tithe was limited to the traditional seven agricultural products. This tithe, and the associated festival of Shavuot, is legislated by the Torah. Textual critics speculate that these regulations were imposed long after the offerings and festival had developed.

By the time of classical antiquity, extensive regulations regarding Bikkurim were recorded in the classical rabbinical literature. According to Jewish law, the corners of fields, wild areas, left-overs after harvesting (gleanings), and unowned crops were not subjected to (and could not be used as) the tithe of First Fruits (they were intended to be left as charity for the poor, and other mendicants); plants from outside Israel were also prohibited from inclusion in the tithe, as was anything belonging to non-Jews. The rules also specify that each type of product had to be individually tithed, even if the numbers were balanced so that there was no difference in amount between this situation and using just some types of First Fruit as the tithe, and retaining others in their entirety. Fruit which was allocated to the tithe could not be swapped for fruit which wasn't, to the extent that wine couldn't be swapped for vinegar, and olive oil couldn't be replaced by olives; furthermore, fruits were not allowed to be individually divided if only part went to the tithe (small whole pomegranates had to be used rather than sections from a large pomegranate, for example).

The separation of tithed produce from untithed produce was also subject to regulation. The individual(s) separating one from the other had to be ritually clean, and had to include the best produce in the tithe if a kohen (priest) lived nearby. During the act of separation, the produce was not permitted to be counted out to determine which fell under the tithe, nor to be weighed for that purpose, nor to be measured for the same reason, but instead the proportion that was to become the tithe had to be guessed at. In certain situations, such as when tithed produce became mixed with non-tithed produce (or there was uncertainty as to whether it had), the tithed produce had to be destroyed. Anyone who made mistakes in the separation of tithed produce, and anyone who consumed any of the tithe, was required to pay compensation as a guilt offering.

The pilgrims that brought the Bikkurim to the Temple were obligated to recite a declaration, also known as the Avowal, set forth in Deuteronomy 26:3-10 (cf. Mishnah, Bikkurim 3:6). Native-born Israelites and proselytes would bring the Bikkurim and would say the Avowal, but women who brought the Bikkurim were not permitted to say the Avowal, since they were unable to claim inheritance in the Land bequeathed unto the tribes by their male lineage. This Avowal was incorporated into a beautiful and grand festive celebration with a procession of pilgrims marching up to Jerusalem and then the Temple with gold, silver or willow baskets to which live birds were tied. (Bikkurim 3:3,5 and 8). The pilgrims were led by flutists to the city of Jerusalem where they were greeted by dignitaries (Bikkurim 3:3). The procession would then resume with the flutist in lead until the Temple Mount where the Levites would break out in song (Bikkurim 3:4). The birds were given as sacrificial offerings and the declaration would be made before a priest while the basket was still on the pilgrim's shoulder (Bikkurim 3:5-6). After the basket was presented to the priest, it was placed by the Altar and the pilgrim would bow and leave (Bikkurim 3:6)

Christian perspective
The idea of having the First Fruits blessed at the church has been celebrated through the feast of Lammas (Loaf Mass Day) in Western Christianity. In Eastern Orthodox Christianity, the 'first fruits' tradition is kept during the Feast of the Transfiguration, held on August 6/19.

In the canonical gospels, the harvest of First Fruits is used metaphorically and allegorically. In the Gospel of Matthew, Jesus is described as stating that "in the time of harvest" he would instruct the harvesters (i.e., the angels) to gather the "tares", bind them into bundles, and burn them, but to "gather the wheat into [his] barn".

Other Christians, as well as early Gnostic writers, argued it was less about sin and more about following Jesus' teachings and abandoning the teachings they had formerly known.  In the Gospel of John, Jesus is described as stating "he that reapeth receiveth wages, and gathereth fruit unto life eternal: that both he that soweth and he that reapeth may rejoice together", which some Christians argue is about rewards from God for those who perform God's work.

First Corinthians also referred to Jesus' resurrection as a type of First Fruit, "But now Christ has been raised from the dead, the first fruits of those who are asleep."

In Eastern Christianity
In the Eastern Orthodox Church the offering of first fruits takes the form of a thanksgiving and blessing. The produce is then consumed by the faithful rather than being given to the Church (though it may be donated as a free-will offering). The liturgical concept behind the blessing is the faithful offering back to God a token of that which he in his lovingkindness has provided, God blessing these first fruits and returning them to the faithful for their benefit and blessing.

The blessing of first fruits traditionally begins on the Great Feast of the Transfiguration (August 6), with the blessing of grapes.  In localities where grapes are not grown, other early-ripening fruits such as apples may be offered. There is a special ceremony at the end of the Divine Liturgy at which the priest blesses the first fruits, asking "that the Lord may bless them, that they may be to us unto rejoicing, and that He may accept a gift of these fruits unto the cleansing of our sins".

As the harvest season progresses, the first fruits of each species can be brought to the church to be blessed, using a similar format, but a different prayer: "that the Lord may receive our gift unto His eternal treasury and grant us an abundance of earthly goods".

In Western Christianity

In the Middle Ages the concept of offering the first fruits was adapted by the Christian church.  This was called a tithe and was basically a tax to support the local clergy and the facility.  In England, every tenth egg, sheaf of wheat, lamb, chicken, and all other animals were given to the church as a tithe, so farm products were expected to be donated throughout the year.

In France, the tithes—called la dîme—were a land and agricultural tax. The offering of first fruits was also referred to as new fruits.  In French churches in the Middle Ages, new fruits were at given seasons presented at Mass for blessing.  The blessed fruits were kept by the church and divided between the clergy and the poor.  Similar customs during the Middle Ages could be found in all European countries.

First Fruits also refers to the payment new clerics made to the bishop or the Pope of all profits from the territory the new cleric controlled.  This payment was called both Annates and First Fruits.

In the Latter Day Saint movement
In the Book of Mormon, a canon of scripture used by the Latter Day Saint movement, a similar passage is found stating "the Holy Messiah, who layeth down his life according to the flesh, and taketh it again by the power of the Spirit, that he may bring to pass the resurrection of the dead, being the first that should rise. Wherefore, he is the firstfruits unto God".

See also
 Bikkurim (Talmud)

References

Further reading 
 
 http://www.christiananswers.net/dictionary/harvest.html
 Bible: ; ; ; ; .
 
 

Jewish sacrificial law
Votive offering
Jewish agrarian laws